Brutus, Lucretia and Collatinus is a painting of  in tempera on panel, attributed to Giovan Francesco Maineri but from preparatory drawings by Ercole de' Roberti. It is in the Galleria Estense in Modena.

This panel, The Wife of Hasdrubal and Her Children and Brutus and Portia were originally part of a series of works depicting famous women of antiquity, probably commissioned by Ercole I d'Este's wife Eleanor of Aragon and referring back to the motto of her father, Ferdinand I of Naples: "Preferisco la morte al disonore" ('I prefer death to dishonour').

References

External links
 

1493 paintings
Este collection
Paintings of Lucretia
Paintings in the collection of the Galleria Estense